Peter of Toledo was a significant translator into Latin of the twelfth century. He was one of the team preparing the first Latin translation of the Qur'an (the Lex Mahumet pseudoprophete).

While not much is known of his life, from his fluency in Arabic he is assumed to have been a Mozarab. His activities as a translator suggest he worked at the Toledo School of Translators, which was supported by the archbishop of Toledo, Raymond de Sauvetât.  Deficiencies in  the translation of Apology of al-Kindy, on which he is known to have worked, indicate that his knowledge of Classical Arabic was limited.

In 1142, Peter the Venerable, abbot of Cluny, visited Spain and recruited a team of translators who were to translate five Arabic texts, including the Qur'an. The collection is known at the Corpus Cluniacense. The translation work went on in 1142–1143. Peter of Toledo appears to have been the principal translator of only one of the texts, the Apology, but he played a key role in the project as a whole, collaborating with three other people who were familiar with Arabic, Robert of Ketton, Herman of Carinthia, a Muslim called Mohammed and also  with Peter of Poitiers, who undertook the polishing of the Latin.  Kritzeck credits Peter of Toledo with having planned and annotated the collection, but this interpretation depends on the Peter being the author of anonymous glosses in a manuscript which has survived in France.

Notes

References
James Kritzeck (1964), Peter the Venerable and Islam

Arabic–Latin translators
Spanish translators
12th-century people from León and Castile
People from Toledo, Spain
Spanish–Arabic translators
Judeo-Arabic literature
Translators of the Quran into Latin